Big Hits (High Tide and Green Grass) is the first compilation album by the Rolling Stones. With different cover art and track listings, it was released on 28 March 1966, on London Records in the US and on 4 November 1966, by Decca Records in the UK.

The American edition focused on songs from 1964 and 1965 with two new tunes: the recent "19th Nervous Breakdown" and the re-recorded "Time Is on My Side" with the guitar intro. The British version covered a longer period, from the group's first single A-side in 1963, "Come On", to several songs from 1966, including the recent hit "Have You Seen Your Mother, Baby, Standing in the Shadow?"

The album reached number three on the US Billboard 200 and number four on the UK Albums Chart. It remained on the chart 99 weeks in the US, where the RIAA certified the album double platinum, signifying over two million copies sold.

Release 
The songs chosen for the American version of Big Hits were roughly split between originals written by Mick Jagger and Keith Richards and those by American R&B and rock 'n' roll musicians, with most of the songs taken from the first five US Stones albums released by London Records. The album cover photo for the US edition was taken at Franklin Canyon Park in the mountains above Beverly Hills by Guy Webster.

The UK Big Hits (High Tide and Green Grass) includes tracks released after the American edition appeared. The Rolling Stones' debut 1963 single, a cover of Chuck Berry's "Come On", was included, but the more successful follow-up, "I Wanna Be Your Man" – composed by rivals (although in reality as friends) Lennon–McCartney – was left off the album. However, an early slick-proof of the album, displayed on Exhibitionism in London in 2016, showed the track as slated for inclusion, but it was ultimately replaced by "Time Is on My Side" by Jerry Ragovoy (as 'Norman Meade'). The fisheye lens-view photo used for the UK front cover was taken in New York City by Jerry Schatzberg, with the back cover featuring the Webster photo from the US cover.

Big Hits (High Tide and Green Grass) reached number four in the UK charts. The British version was again made available to the public as part of a limited edition vinyl box set, titled "The Rolling Stones 1964–1969", in November 2010. It was also re-released digitally at the same time. The vinyl version of the album includes a booklet pasted into the gatefold with color photos of the Rolling Stones in concert and in the studio.

Once more, the UK version was released on Record Store Day in 2019 on Green Vinyl, to go along with the release on its second volume, Through the Past, Darkly, which was released on orange vinyl for both Record Store Day and its 50th anniversary, as stated on the Record Store Day sticker affixed on the front of the vinyl cover.

Critical reception 

In a retrospective review for AllMusic, Bruce Eder said the US edition of Big Hits is "still one of the most potent collections of singles that one can find... Appearing as it did in the late winter of 1966, this collection completely missed the group's drift into psychedelia, and it has since been supplanted by Hot Rocks and More Hot Rocks, but Big Hits is still the most concentrated dose of the early Stones at their most accessible that is to be had, short of simply playing their first five U.S. albums." Reviewing the 2002 ABKCO reissue, Kent H. Benjamin from The Austin Chronicle regarded it as essential in order to "get most of the Stones' original singles in true stereo".

Music biographer and journalist Johnny Rogan said that in the UK, Big Hits and the Beatles' December 1966 compilation A Collection of Beatles Oldies were significant because "Britain's two premier groups" had issued "greatest hits collections in the home market for the first time in their careers". Both albums, in his opinion, "represented a coming of age, reminding listeners and the artistes themselves that they were already the equivalent of heritage acts, whose remarkable run of hits qualified them for a rare , unlikely to be repeated for many years, if ever."

Track listing

US edition

UK edition

Personnel 
The Rolling Stones
Mick Jaggerlead vocals, harmonica, percussion
Brian Jonesrhythm  and lead guitar, slide guitar, sitar, harmonica, dulcimer, backing vocals
Keith Richardslead and rhythm guitar, backing vocals
Charlie Wattsdrums, percussion
Bill Wymanbass guitar, organ, backing vocals

Additional personnel
Jack Nitzschepiano, harpsichord, percussion
Phil Spectorpercussion
Ian Stewartpiano, organ

Charts

Certification

References

Further reading

External links 
 

The Rolling Stones compilation albums
1966 greatest hits albums
ABKCO Records compilation albums
Decca Records compilation albums
London Records compilation albums
Albums produced by Andrew Loog Oldham
Albums recorded at IBC Studios